The following outline is provided as an overview of and topical guide to Mauritania:

Mauritania – sovereign country located in West Africa.  Mauritania is bordered by the Atlantic Ocean on the west, by Senegal on the southwest, by Mali on the east and southeast, by Algeria on the northeast, and by the Morocco-controlled Western Sahara on the northwest. It is named after the ancient Berber kingdom of Mauretania. The capital and largest city is Nouakchott, located on the Atlantic coast.

General reference

 Pronunciation: 
 Common English country name:  Mauritania
 Official English country name:  The Islamic Republic of Mauritania
 Common endonym(s):  
 Official endonym(s):  
 Adjectival(s): Mauritanian
 Demonym(s):
 ISO country codes:  MR, MRT, 478
 ISO region codes:  See ISO 3166-2:MR
 Internet country code top-level domain:  .mr

Geography of Mauritania 

Geography of Mauritania
 Mauritania is: a country
 Population of Mauritania: 3,124,000  - 135th most populous country
 Area of Mauritania: 1,030,700 km2
 Atlas of Mauritania

Location 
 Mauritania is situated within the following regions:
 Northern Hemisphere and Western Hemisphere
 Africa
 Sahara Desert
 North Africa
 West Africa
 Time zone:  Coordinated Universal Time UTC+00
 Extreme points of Mauritania
 High:  Kediet ej Jill 
 Low:  Sebkha de Ndrhamcha 
 Land boundaries:  5,074 km
 2,237 km
 1,561 km
 813 km
 463 km
 Coastline:  754 km

Environment of Mauritania 

 Climate of Mauritania
 Ecoregions in Mauritania
 Wildlife of Mauritania
 Fauna of Mauritania
 Birds of Mauritania
 Mammals of Mauritania

Natural geographic features of Mauritania 

 Glaciers in Mauritania: none 
 Rivers of Mauritania
 World Heritage Sites in Mauritania

Regions of Mauritania 

Regions of Mauritania

Ecoregions of Mauritania 

List of ecoregions in Mauritania
 Ecoregions in Mauritania

Administrative divisions of Mauritania 

Administrative divisions of Mauritania
 Regions of Mauritania
 Departments of Mauritania

Departments of Mauritania 

Departments of Mauritania

Settlements in Mauritania 

 Capital of Mauritania: Nouakchott
 Cities of Mauritania

Demography of Mauritania 

Demographics of Mauritania

Government and politics of Mauritania  

Politics of Mauritania
 Form of government:
 Capital of Mauritania: Nouakchott
 Elections in Mauritania
 Political parties in Mauritania

Branches of the government of Mauritania 

Government of Mauritania

Executive branch of the government of Mauritania 
 Head of state: President of Mauritania,
 Head of government: Prime Minister of Mauritania,

Legislative branch of the government of Mauritania 
 Parliament of Mauritania (bicameral)
 Upper house: Senate of Mauritania
 Lower house: National Assembly of Mauritania

Judicial branch of the government of Mauritania 

Court system of Mauritania

Foreign relations of Mauritania 

Foreign relations of Mauritania
 Diplomatic missions in Mauritania
 Diplomatic missions of Mauritania

International organization membership of Mauritania 
The Islamic Republic of Mauritania is a member of:

African, Caribbean, and Pacific Group of States (ACP)
African Development Bank Group (AfDB)
African Union (AU)
Arab Bank for Economic Development in Africa (ABEDA)
Arab Fund for Economic and Social Development (AFESD)
Arab Maghreb Union (AMU)
Arab Monetary Fund (AMF)
Council of Arab Economic Unity (CAEU)
Food and Agriculture Organization (FAO)
Group of 77 (G77)
International Atomic Energy Agency (IAEA)
International Bank for Reconstruction and Development (IBRD)
International Civil Aviation Organization (ICAO)
International Criminal Police Organization (Interpol)
International Development Association (IDA)
International Federation of Red Cross and Red Crescent Societies (IFRCS)
International Finance Corporation (IFC)
International Fund for Agricultural Development (IFAD)
International Labour Organization (ILO)
International Maritime Organization (IMO)
International Monetary Fund (IMF)
International Olympic Committee (IOC)
International Organization for Migration (IOM)
International Red Cross and Red Crescent Movement (ICRM)

International Telecommunication Union (ITU)
International Telecommunications Satellite Organization (ITSO)
International Trade Union Confederation (ITUC)
Inter-Parliamentary Union (IPU)
Islamic Development Bank (IDB)
League of Arab States (LAS)
Multilateral Investment Guarantee Agency (MIGA)
Nonaligned Movement (NAM)
Organisation internationale de la Francophonie (OIF)
Organisation of Islamic Cooperation (OIC)
Organisation for the Prohibition of Chemical Weapons (OPCW)
United Nations (UN)
United Nations Conference on Trade and Development (UNCTAD)
United Nations Educational, Scientific, and Cultural Organization (UNESCO)
United Nations Industrial Development Organization (UNIDO)
Universal Postal Union (UPU)
World Confederation of Labour (WCL)
World Customs Organization (WCO)
World Federation of Trade Unions (WFTU)
World Health Organization (WHO)
World Intellectual Property Organization (WIPO)
World Meteorological Organization (WMO)
World Tourism Organization (UNWTO)
World Trade Organization (WTO)

Law and order in Mauritania 

Law of Mauritania
 Constitution of Mauritania
 Crime in Mauritania
 Human rights in Mauritania
 LGBT rights in Mauritania
 Freedom of religion in Mauritania
 Law enforcement in Mauritania

Military of Mauritania 

Military of Mauritania
 Command
 Commander-in-chief:
 Forces
 Army of Mauritania
 Air Force of Mauritania

Local government in Mauritania 

Local government in Mauritania

History of Mauritania 

History of Mauritania

Culture of Mauritania 

Culture of Mauritania
 Cuisine of Mauritania
 Languages of Mauritania
 National symbols of Mauritania
 Coat of arms of Mauritania
 Flag of Mauritania
 National Anthem of Mauritania
 Public holidays in Mauritania
 Religion in Mauritania
 Christianity in Mauritania
 Hinduism in Mauritania
 Islam in Mauritania
 World Heritage Sites in Mauritania

Art in Mauritania 
 Cinema of Mauritania
 Music of Mauritania

Sports in Mauritania 

Sports in Mauritania
 Football in Mauritania
 Mauritania at the Olympics

Economy and infrastructure of Mauritania 

Economy of Mauritania
 Economic rank, by nominal GDP (2007): 151st (one hundred and fifty first)
 Agriculture in Mauritania
 Communications in Mauritania
 Internet in Mauritania
 Companies of Mauritania
Currency of Mauritania: Ouguiya
ISO 4217: MRO
 Health care in Mauritania
 Mining in Mauritania
 Tourism in Mauritania
 Transport in Mauritania
 Airports in Mauritania
 Rail transport in Mauritania

Education in Mauritania 

Education in Mauritania

Health in Mauritania 

Health in Mauritania

See also

Mauritania
Index of Mauritania-related articles
List of international rankings
List of Mauritania-related topics
Member state of the United Nations
Outline of Africa
Outline of geography

References

External links

Mauritania